This is a list of the Czech Republic national football team results from 1994 to 2019.

Before 2000

1. Czech Republic's score given first

Key
 H = Home match
 A = Away match
 N = Neutral site match
 F = Friendly
 UEFAq = UEFA European Championships qualification
 UEFA = UEFA European Championships
 WCq = FIFA World Cup qualification (UEFA)
 WC = FIFA World Cup
 CC = Confederations Cup

2000

2001

2002

2003

2004

2005

2006

2007

2008

2009

2010

2011

2012

2013

2014

2015

2016

2017

2018

2019

External links
 RSSSF page
 FIFA link

References

Czech Republic national football team results